The Sutter County Museum, (formerly the Community Memorial Museum of Sutter County), established in 1975 is the showplace and storehouse for many Yuba-Sutter history treasures and memories. The museum has Nisenan artifacts as well as many from early settlers around the time of the California Gold Rush. The Museum is run as a department of local government by Sutter County, and is located at 1333 Butte House Road, Yuba City, California.

See also
Yuba–Sutter area

External links
Official Site
Sutter County Official Site

Yuba City, California
Museums established in 1975
John Sutter
Museums in Sutter County, California
History museums in California
1975 establishments in California